Orthognathus subparallelus is a species of beetle in the family Dryophthoridae. It is found in Central America and North America.

References

Further reading

 
 

Dryophthorinae
Articles created by Qbugbot
Beetles described in 1880